Rainer Sachse (born 15 June 1950) is a German former footballer.

Sachse scored 83 goals in 208 East German top flight matches.

The forward won 2 caps for East Germany in 1977.

References

External links
 
 
 

1950 births
Living people
Footballers from Dresden
German footballers
East German footballers
East Germany international footballers
Association football forwards
Dresdner SC players
Dynamo Dresden players
DDR-Oberliga players
20th-century German people